Vice Admiral Edward Allen Burkhalter, Jr. (September 15, 1928 – July 1, 2020) was a United States Navy admiral.

Biography
Burkhalter was born in Roanoke, Alabama. He attended the U.S. Naval Academy and graduated in 1951.

Burkhalter's primary Naval career was in submarines, but the last 10 years of his career focused on intelligence. He served as Chief of Naval Intelligence, Defense Intelligence Agency and later as the DIA's Chief of Staff, and Director of the Intelligence Community Staff, Central Intelligence Agency. He also served as Director of Strategic Operations for the Chairman of the Joint Chiefs of Staff.

He was a recipient of the Defense Superior Service Medal with two Gold Stars, the Legion of Merit with two Gold Stars, the Navy and Marine Corps Commendation Medal and was entitled to wear the Submarine Warfare Officer Badge and the SSBN Deterrent Patrol Badge. 

Burkhalter was president of Burkhalter Associates, Inc., a consultancy firm.  Burkhalter served as a director on the board of SteelCloud, Inc. from 1997 to 2007.  In July 2006, he became the Chairman of the Board of SteelCloud, Inc.

See also

References

External links
Navy Future
https://web.archive.org/web/20061026083254/http://www.centerforsecuritypolicy.org/index.jsp?section=papers&code=98-P_08

1928 births
2020 deaths
People from Roanoke, Alabama
United States Navy vice admirals
United States Naval Academy alumni
Military personnel from Alabama
Burials at the United States Naval Academy Cemetery